Montpelier station or Montpellier station may refer to:

Montpelier railway station, a train station in Bristol, England
Montpelier railway station, Jamaica, a former railway station on the List of National Heritage Sites in Jamaica
Montpelier station (Vermont), an Amtrak station in Montpelier, Vermont
Montpelier Station, Virginia, a community in Virginia
Montpelier Depot, a historic depot in Orange County, Virginia
Montpellier station (REM), a train station in Montreal, Canada
Gare de Montpellier-Saint-Roch, train station in Montpellier, France

See also
Montpelier (disambiguation)